The 1953 Cleveland Indians season was a season in American baseball. The team finished second in the American League with a record of 92–62, 8½ games behind the New York Yankees.

Offseason 
 December 11, 1952: Earl Averill, Jr. was signed as an amateur free agent by the Indians.

Regular season 
Al Rosen became the first third baseman in the history of the American League to win the MVP Award.

Season standings

Record vs. opponents

Notable transactions 
 May 1953: Brooks Lawrence was acquired from the Indians by the Cincinnati Reds.
 June 15, 1953: Ray Boone, Al Aber, Steve Gromek, and Dick Weik were traded by the Indians to the Detroit Tigers for Art Houtteman, Owen Friend, Bill Wight, and Joe Ginsberg.

Roster

Player stats

Batting

Starters by position 
Note: Pos = Position; G = Games played; AB = At bats; H = Hits; Avg. = Batting average; HR = Home runs; RBI = Runs batted in

Other batters 
Note: G = Games played; AB = At bats; H = Hits; Avg. = Batting average; HR = Home runs; RBI = Runs batted in

Pitching

Starting pitchers 
Note: G = Games pitched; IP = Innings pitched; W = Wins; L = Losses; ERA = Earned run average; SO = Strikeouts

Other pitchers 
Note: G = Games pitched; IP = Innings pitched; W = Wins; L = Losses; ERA = Earned run average; SO = Strikeouts

Relief pitchers 
Note: G = Games pitched; W = Wins; L = Losses; SV = Saves; ERA = Earned run average; SO = Strikeouts

Awards and records 
 Al Rosen, American League MVP

Farm system 

LEAGUE CHAMPIONS: Fargo-Moorhead, Daytona Beach, Green Bay

 On May 6, 1953, the Fargo-Moorhead Twins defeated Sioux Falls in their Opening Day game by a score of 12–3. A record crowd of 10,123 fans came to Barnett Field. In the game, Roger Maris got his first professional baseball hit. That season, Twins player Frank Gravino would hit 52 home runs. The Twins would host the Northern League All-Star game and defeat the Northern League All-Stars by a score of 8–4. The Twins finished with a record of 86–39 (improving from their record of 44–80 in 1952) and bested Duluth to win the Northern League championship. Roger Maris was selected as the 1953 Northern League Rookie of the Year.

Notes

References 
1953 Cleveland Indians season at Baseball Reference

Cleveland Indians seasons
Cleveland Indians season
Cleveland Indians